Sir James Loy MacMillan,  (born 16 July 1959) is a Scottish classical composer and conductor.

Early life
MacMillan was born at Kilwinning, in North Ayrshire, but lived in the East Ayrshire town of Cumnock until 1977. His father is James MacMillan and his mother is Ellen MacMillan (née Loy).

He studied composition at the University of Edinburgh with Rita McAllister and Kenneth Leighton, and at Durham University with John Casken, where he gained an undergraduate degree and then a PhD degree in 1987. At Durham he was a member of the College of St Hild and St Bede as an undergraduate student and the Graduate Society while studying for his PhD. He was a lecturer in music at the Victoria University of Manchester from 1986 to 1988. After his studies, MacMillan returned to Scotland, composing prolifically, and becoming Associate Composer with the Scottish Chamber Orchestra, often working on education projects. As a young man he was briefly a member of the Young Communist League.

Rising success
He came to the attention of the classical establishment with the BBC Scottish Symphony Orchestra's premiere of The Confession of Isobel Gowdie at the Proms in 1990. Isobel Gowdie was one of many women executed for witchcraft in 17th-century Scotland.  According to the composer, "On behalf of the Scottish people the work craves absolution and offers Isobel Gowdie the mercy and humanity that was denied her in the last days of her life".

The work's international acclaim spurred more high-profile commissions, including a percussion concerto for fellow Scot Evelyn Glennie: Veni, Veni, Emmanuel. It was premiered in 1992 and has become MacMillan's most performed work.  He was also asked by Mstislav Rostropovich to compose his Cello Concerto, which was premiered by Rostropovich himself in 1997.

Further successes have included his second opera The Sacrifice, commissioned by Welsh National Opera, Autumn 2007, which won a Royal Philharmonic Society Award, and the St John Passion jointly commissioned by the London Symphony Orchestra and Boston Symphony Orchestra and conducted by Sir Colin Davis at its world premiere in April 2008.  He was awarded the British Composer Award for Liturgical Music, for his Strathclyde Motets, in December 2008.

In 2019, The Guardian ranked MacMillan's Stabat Mater the 23rd greatest work of art music since 2000.

Influences
MacMillan's music is infused with the spiritual and the political.  His Catholic faith has inspired many of his sacred works; for example, a Magnificat (1999), and several masses. This central strand of his life and compositions was marked by the BBC Symphony Orchestra in early 2005, with a survey of his music entitled From Darkness into Light. MacMillan and his wife are lay Dominicans, and he has collaborated with Michael Symmons Roberts, a Catholic poet, and also Rowan Williams, the Archbishop of Canterbury. Perhaps his most political work is Cantos Sagrados (1990), a setting of Latin American poetry by Ariel Dorfman and Ana Maria Mendoza, combining elements of liberation theology with more conventional religious texts. MacMillan has explicitly stated that his aim in writing this work was to emphasise 'a deeper solidarity with the poor of that subcontinent' in the context of political repression.

Scottish traditional music has also had a profound musical influence, and is frequently discernible in his works.  When the Scottish Parliament was reconvened in 1999 after 292 years, a fanfare composed by MacMillan accompanied the Queen into the chamber.  Weeks after the opening ceremony, MacMillan launched a vigorous attack on sectarianism in Scotland, particularly anti-Catholicism, in a speech entitled "Scotland's Shame".

His Mass of 2000 was commissioned by Westminster Cathedral and contains sections which the congregation may join in singing. Similarly, the St Anne's Mass and Galloway Mass do not require advanced musicianship, being designed to be taught to a congregation.

One of his most important commissions (by the Bishops' Conferences of England & Wales and of Scotland) was to write a new mass setting for choir and congregation to be sung at two of the three masses celebrated by Pope Benedict XVI during his Apostolic and state visit to Great Britain in 2010. First sung at mass at Bellahouston Park, Glasgow, on 16 September it was sung again at the mass and beatification of John Henry Newman at Cofton Park, Birmingham, on 19 September). He was also commissioned to write a setting of the text Tu es Petrus (Matthew 16:18) for the Pope's entry at mass at Westminster Cathedral on 18 September.

BBC Radio Three broadcast in 2020-2021 Faith in Music, Macmillan's examination of religious faith in the work of seven composers from Thomas Tallis to Leonard Bernstein.

Appointments and collaborations
MacMillan was composer and conductor with the BBC Philharmonic from 2000 to 2009, following which he took up a position as principal guest conductor with the Netherlands Radio Chamber Philharmonic.  His collaboration with Michael Symmons Roberts continued with his second opera, The Sacrifice (based on the ancient Welsh tales of the Mabinogion), being premiered by Welsh National Opera in Autumn 2007. Sundogs, a large-scale work for a cappella choir, also using text by Symmons Roberts, was premiered by the Indiana University Contemporary Vocal Ensemble in August 2006.

He is an Honorary Fellow of Blackfriars Hall, University of Oxford.  He is patron of St Mary's Music School in Edinburgh, of the London Oratory School Schola Cantorum along with Simon Callow and Princess Michael of Kent, and he has been appointed patron of The British Art Music Series along with Libby Purves and John Wilson, and of the Schola Cantorum of the Cardinal Vaughan Memorial School

He was appointed a Commander of the Order of the British Empire (CBE) in 2004, and a Knight Bachelor in 2015.

In 2008, he became Honorary Patron of London Chamber Orchestra's LCO New: Explore project, which explores links between music and other art forms and fosters emerging creative talent in composition. He also serves as the Honorary President of the Bearsden Choir. and he is Patron of the Strathearn Music Society based in Crieff.

Personal life
MacMillan married Lynne Frew in 1983; they have two daughters and a son. He also had a granddaughter, Sara Maria, who had Dandy–Walker syndrome. He said of her short life that, "We have been blessed and transformed through knowing and loving Sara, and being known and loved in return by her."

Key works

 After the Tryst (violin and piano – 1988)
 Cantos Sagrados (choir and organ – 1989)
 The Confession of Isobel Gowdie (orchestra – 1990)
 The Berserking (piano concerto – 1990)
 Veni, Veni, Emmanuel (percussion concerto – 1992)
 Seven Last Words from the Cross (cantata: choir and strings – 1993)
 Inés de Castro (opera, libretto: Jo Clifford – 1991–95)
 Britannia! (orchestra – 1994)
 Christus Vincit (1994), for SSAATTBB and Soli
 Three Scottish Songs, voice and piano (text: William Soutar) (1995)
 Cello Concerto (1996)
 The World's Ransoming (cor anglais and orchestra – 1996)
 Symphony: Vigil (1997)
 Quickening (soloists, chorus and orchestra – 1998)
 Symphony No. 2 (1999)
 Mass (choir and organ – 2000)
 Cello Sonata No. 2, dedicated to Julian Lloyd Webber
 The Birds of Rhiannon (orchestra + optional chorus, text: Michael Symmons Roberts – 2001)
 O Bone Jesu (2001), for SSAATTBB + soli
 Symphony No. 3 "Silence" (2002)
 Piano Concerto No. 2 (2003)
 A Scotch Bestiary (organ and orchestra – 2004)
 Sun-Dogs (2006)
 The Sacrifice (2007)
 St John Passion (2008)
 Piano Concerto No. 3 "The Mysteries of Light" (2008)
 Miserere, mixed chorus a cappella (2009)
 Violin Concerto (2009)
 Oboe Concerto (2010)
 Clemency (2011)
 Woman of the Apocalypse (2012)
 St Luke Passion (2013)
 Viola Concerto (2013)
 Percussion Concerto No. 2 (2014)
 Symphony No. 4 (2015)
 Stabat Mater (2015)
 A European Requiem (2015)
 Larghetto for orchestra (transcription of Miserere, 2017)
 Symphony No. 5 "Le grand Inconnu" (2018)
 A Christmas Oratorio (2021)
 "Who shall separate us?", anthem for the state funeral of Elizabeth II (2022)

Bibliography

Articles

Books

Critical studies and reviews of MacMillan's work
 
 Spicer, Paul. James MacMillan: Choral Music: a practical commentary and survey. Boosey & Hawkes (2001, updated 2021)

References

Further reading
 Capps, Michael. 2007. "Warld in a Roar: The Music of James MacMillan". Image: A Journal of the Arts and Religion, no. 54 (Summer) 95–108.
 Denis, Joe. Review of St John Passion, Manchester Salon, April 2011
 Hallam, Mandy. 2008. "Conversation with James MacMillan". Tempo 62, no. 245 (July) 17–29.
 Johnson, Stephen. 2001. "MacMillan, James (Loy)". The New Grove Dictionary of Music and Musicians, second edition, edited by Stanley Sadie and John Tyrrell. London: Macmillan Publishers.
 Reich, Wieland. 2005. Neuigkeiten eines Nazareners? Zur Musik von James MacMillan. Fragmen: Beiträge, Meinungen und Analysen zur neuen Musik 47. Saarbrücken: Pfau-Verlag. .
 Smith, Rowena. 2007. "Celtic Parallels". Opera (UK) 58, no. 9 (September): 1038–43.
 Whittall, Arnold, and Alison Latham. 2002. "MacMillan, James (Loy)". The Oxford Companion to Music, second edition, edited by Alison Latham. Oxford and New York: Oxford University Press. .
 York, John. 2002. "The Makings of a Cycle? James MacMillan's Cello and Piano Sonatas". Tempo, no. 221 (July): 24–28.

External links

 Desert Island Discs – Sir James MacMillan at BBC Radio 4
 
  (accessed 12 October 2014).
 James MacMillan unofficial site at Classical Net
 James MacMillan profile at BBC Philharmonic
 Hewett, Ivan; James MacMillan interview; Daily Telegraph, 22 April 2009
Reviews of world première of the Violin Concerto
 Picard, Anna; Review; The Independent, 16 May 2010
 Morrison, Richard; Review; Times Online 14 May 2010
 Ashley, Tim; Review; The Guardian, 17 May 2010
Review of Seven Last Words from the Cross
 Review; Gramophone, September 2009
Personal life
 Sweeney, Charlene; Composer James MacMillan says Scotland in denial over anti-Catholicism; Times Online, 8 December 2009
 Grey, Richard; Composer's note of anger over music education; Scotland on Sunday, 20 November 2005

20th-century classical composers
21st-century classical composers
Scottish classical composers
British male classical composers
Scottish conductors (music)
British male conductors (music)
Honorary Members of the Royal Academy of Music
Academics of the University of Manchester
Alumni of the University of Edinburgh
Commanders of the Order of the British Empire
Knights Bachelor
Composers awarded knighthoods
Lay Dominicans
Scottish Roman Catholics
People from Kilwinning
1959 births
Living people
Scottish opera composers
Male opera composers
Recipients of the Medal of the Royal College of Organists
Fellows of Blackfriars, Oxford
20th-century Scottish musicians
20th-century British composers
21st-century British composers
20th-century British conductors (music)
21st-century British conductors (music)
20th-century British male musicians
21st-century British male musicians
Alumni of the College of St Hild and St Bede, Durham
Alumni of Durham University Graduate Society